Sylvain Maréchal (15 August 1750 – 18 January 1803) was a French essayist, poet, philosopher and political theorist, whose views presaged utopian socialism and communism. His views on a future golden age are occasionally described as utopian anarchism. He was editor of the newspaper .

Early life 
Born in Paris as the son of a wine merchant, he studied jurisprudence and became a lawyer in the capital. At the age of 20, he published , a collection of idylls, successful enough to ensure his employment at the Collège Mazirin as an aide-librarian.

Maréchal was an admirer of Jean-Jacques Rousseau, Voltaire, Claude Adrien Helvétius, and Denis Diderot, and associated with deist and atheist authors.

Vision 
He developed his own views of an agrarian socialism where all goods would be shared. In  ("Fragments of a Moral Poem on God"), he aimed to replace elements of practiced religion with a cult of Virtue and faith with Reason (see Cult of Reason).

His critique of both religion and political absolutism ( - "Book Salvaged from the Flood", a parody of the Bible) and his atheism caused him to lose his position at the College; Maréchal was forced to live off his literary output.

The months were given names numbered one through twelve (for example, March is the first month, listed as "", while February is "". The calendar also replaced the usual figures of a calendars of saints with famous characters (such as Blaise Pascal). Later editions of the Almanach used the French Republican Calendar.
From this moment on until his death he published anonymously - to prevent further prosecutions.

Atheist ideology 
During Maréchal's lifetime, atheism was consistently frowned upon by the highly religious people of France. Living in a traditionalist Christian country, he would often write about his thoughts on the church, often critical of the doctrines and beliefs held by the Christians of his time.

In his 1799 essay, Preliminary discourse, or Answer to the question: What is an atheist?, Sylvain Maréchal proclaimed that he had no more need of God than God needed him, and proclaimed such an attitude was "true atheism" after rejecting several competing stances. He outright rejected the idea of masters ruling his life, and that included the will of any god. For him, to believe in God is to submit to hierarchy.

Revolution 
An enthusiastic supporter of the French Revolution, Maréchal also advocated the defense of the poor. He did not become involved in the conflict opposing Girondists and Jacobins, and became instead worried about the outcome of revolutionary events, especially after the Thermidorian Reaction and the establishment of the French Directory. The encounter between him and François-Noël Babeuf (Gracchus Babeuf) and involvement in the latter's conspiracy was to find in Maréchal an early influence on utopian socialism, as evidenced by the manifesto he wrote in support of Babeuf's goals -  (first issued in 1796).

He died at Montrouge in 1803.

Works 
 (1770)
 (1770)
 (1775)
 (1780)

 (1781)
 (1782)
 (1784)
 (1788)
 (1788)
 (1788)
 (1791)
 (théâtre, 1793)
 (1798)
 (1798)
 (1798)
 (1799)
 (1800)
 (1801).
 (1801)

Works in English translation 
The Woman Priest: A Translation of Sylvain Marechal's Novella, "La femme abbe" , translated by Sheila Delany, 2016, University of Alberta Press.

See also 

 Society of the Friends of Truth
 History of Socialism

References

External links 
 Sylvain Maréchal's essays translated in English at Marxist Internet Archive 
 Sylvain Maréchal on data.bnf.fr
 
 
 Archive of Pierre Sylvain Maréchal Papers at the International Institute of Social History

18th-century atheists
18th-century French male writers
18th-century French poets
18th-century French dramatists and playwrights
French opera librettists
French philosophers
French atheists
Atheist philosophers
French communists
French socialists
Enlightenment philosophers
18th-century French lawyers
French erotica writers
Newspaper editors of the French Revolution
People involved in the Conspiracy of the Equals
French male essayists
Writers from Paris
1750 births
1803 deaths
18th-century essayists
19th-century atheists
18th-century socialists
Proto-anarchists